Donald Ralph "Skip" Ewing (born March 6, 1964) is an American country music singer and songwriter. Active since 1988, Ewing has recorded nine studio albums and has charted 15 singles on the Billboard country charts.

Career
Ewing was born in Redlands, California, United States. He first began to gain national attention during the mid-1980s, both as a songwriter and recording artist for MCA and Capitol Records. His 1988 debut, The Coast of Colorado, produced the number 3 hit "Burnin' a Hole in My Heart" and four other top 20 country hits. The Will to Love included the top 5 hit "It's You Again". Although none of Ewing's subsequent chart entries made the Top 40, he released eight more albums from 1990 to 2009.

Ewing is a notable attendee of Columbine High School in Jefferson County, Colorado, and Redlands High School in Redlands, California.

In 1990, Ewing wrote two songs for Kenny Rogers' album Love Is Strange: "Listen to the Rain" and "If I Were a Painting".

In 2008, he served as the duet partner of the radio version of Reba McEntire's single, "Every Other Weekend". He also co-wrote the single; the song reached the Top 20 on the Billboard Country Chart. Although the song was credited for one week to Ewing and Kenny Chesney as ""Every Other Weekend" by Reba McEntire and Skip Ewing or Kenny Chesney", the song was thereafter credited to McEntire alone on the chart.

Awards 
 Broadcast Music Incorporated (BMI) Songwriter of the Year 2000;
 Nashville Songwriters Association International (NSAI) Song of the Year;
 Country Music Association (CMA) Triple Play Award (three No. 1 songs within 12 months).

Additionally, Ewing has received a CMA Song of the Year nomination, a Grammy nomination, a Tony nomination and multiple BMI "Million Air" awards.

Horse and Writer 
Horse and Writer is an annual songwriting retreat Skip Ewing organizes every year with members of the Nashville songwriting community. The retreat lasts six days, and takes place at the Triangle C Ranch in Dubois, Wyoming. The mission is to help aspiring songwriters realize their potential, as they are mentored by experienced pros like Ewing, who describes the event as "a labor of love."

Discography

Studio albums

Compilation albums

Singles

As a featured artist

Music videos

Notes

References

External links
 Skip Ewing official website

1964 births
American country singer-songwriters
American male singer-songwriters
MCA Records artists
Capitol Records artists
Word Records artists
Singer-songwriters from California
Columbine High School alumni
Living people
People from Redlands, California
Country musicians from California
Singer-songwriters from Colorado